The Złote Tarasy (Golden Terraces) is a commercial, office, and entertainment
complex in the center of Warsaw, Poland, located next to the Warszawa Centralna railway station between the Jana Pawła II and Emilii Plater streets. It opened on 7 February 2007.

Building 
The architectural concept of Złote Tarasy was designed by The Jerde Partnership, for which the firm received the 2006 Architectural Review MIPIM Future Project Award in the Retail and Leisure category. The total area of the building amounts to 205,000 m². It includes 200 shops and restaurants (occupying 63,500 m²), a hotel, a multiplex cinema (8 screens, 2560 seats, opened on 31 August 2007) and an underground parking garage for 1,400 cars.

A transparent diagrid roof, designed and built by Austrian specialist façade contractor Waagner Biro, covers its signature central indoor courtyard containing commercial "terraces" - several floors of shops stacked one upon another.

The building was built and is operated as a joint venture between ING Real Estate and the Warszawa Śródmieście borough and cost $500 million to build.

The mall hosts Poland's first Hard Rock Cafe as well as the first Burger King in the company's second attempt to compete with McDonald's in Poland.

The office complex houses the Embassy of the United Arab Emirates to Poland.

Gallery

See also
 List of tallest buildings in Poland

References

Bibliography

 "Light and space is winning formula." Estates Gazette. 4 March 2006.
 "I-City architect receives more accolades" in New Straits Times (Malaysia). 25 March 2006.

External links 
 
  

Music venues completed in 2007
Office buildings completed in 2007
Buildings and structures in Warsaw
Shopping malls in Warsaw
Tourist attractions in Warsaw
Śródmieście, Warsaw
Shopping malls established in 2007
2007 establishments in Poland